Two branches of the Rospigliosi family had independent palaces in Pistoia, region of Tuscany, Italy:

Palazzo Rospigliosi a via del Duca, birthplace of Clement IX
Palazzo Rospigliosi a Ripa del Sale, presently Diocesan Museum and Museo Clemente Rospigliosi